Rehoboth Beach is a city on the Atlantic Ocean along the Delaware Beaches in eastern Sussex County, Delaware. As of the 2010 U.S. census, the population was 1,327, reflecting a decline of 161 (11.2%) from the 1,488 counted in the 2000 census. Along with the neighboring coastal town of Lewes, Rehoboth Beach is one of the principal cities of Delaware's rapidly growing Cape Region. Rehoboth Beach lies within the Salisbury metropolitan area.

A popular, affluent vacation destination, many individuals maintain summer homes in Rehoboth Beach, including current U.S. President Joe Biden. During on-season, Rehoboth Beach's population expands to over 25,000 within the city limits and thousands more in the surrounding area in the summer. 

In 2011, the NRDC awarded Rehoboth Beach with a 5-Star rating in water quality. This award was given only to 12 other locations, one being neighboring Dewey Beach. Out of the 30 states with coastline, the Delaware Beaches ranked number one for water quality in 2011.

History

Many centuries ago, sea levels were lower, and the Atlantic Coast lay about  farther east than it does today. At the time, the area would have resembled inland portions of southern Delaware today. By the time the first Europeans arrived in the area in the 17th century, the coastline was at its present location and several Native American Indian tribes lived in the area, including the Lenape (or Delaware), the Sikkonese, the Assateagues, and the Nanticoke. The site was the location of what may have been the most important Native American fishing village on the Middle Atlantic coast (the evidence has been obliterated by development, such as the Wilgus Site a prehistoric shell midden archeological location which is now inundated). Pressure from English and Dutch settlers radiating outward from Cape Henlopen near Lewes, Delaware at the entrance to Delaware Bay forced the Lenape to migrate to upper New York state, eastern Canada, and eventually to the west in Indian Territory (later formed Oklahoma, Kansas, parts of Arkansas) while the Sikkonese and Assateagues were extirpated; the Nanticoke, however, still exist in the general area today. The land later came under the control of the Duke of York, younger brother of King Charles II who also seized and occupied in 1664 the Dutch colony further north at the mouth of the Hudson River on Manhattan Island and adjacent Long Island as New Netherland with Fort Amsterdam and the village of New Amsterdam. Followed by the previous Swedish colony on the upper Delaware River at Fort Christina and New Sweden (which the Dutch had attacked and occupied several years earlier). These later became part of the English and later British America colonies/provinces of New York state and New York town along with renamed Wilmington and New Castle along the Delaware River as part of the colonial Province of Pennsylvania and later in the future state of Delaware. Later the Duke himself granted holdings to various landholders who endured into the 18th century. The duke later ascended to the English throne himself as King James II of England and also James VII of Scotland.

By the mid-19th century, the descendants of these landholders were farmers attempting to make a living off the relatively poor sandy infertile land.

The town was founded in 1873 as the Rehoboth Beach Camp Meeting Association by the Rev. Robert W. Todd, of St. Paul's Methodist Episcopal Church of Wilmington, Delaware, as a site for Methodist (Methodist Episcopal Church) camp meetings in the spirit of similar resorts further north on the New Jersey shore, such as Ocean Grove. The Camp Meeting Association disbanded in 1881, and in 1891, the location was incorporated by the General Assembly of Delaware (state legislature) as "Cape Henlopen City". In 1893, it was renamed to Rehoboth Beach.

Rehoboth means "broad spaces." It appears three times in the Old Testament as a place name: a well dug by Isaac (at modern Wadi er-Ruheibeh) (Genesis 26:22), a city on the Euphrates River (Genesis 36:37; I Chronicles 1:48), and one of the cities of Asshur (Genesis 10:11) in Mesopotamia (modern Iraq). Hence the name may have had a special appeal for the religious founders of the city, although the adjacent bay had already borne the name Rehoboth for at least a century before the town was founded.

The first boardwalk in Rehoboth Beach was constructed in 1873 and has seen changes in configuration from weather and storms over the years. The Junction and Breakwater Railroad constructed a line from Lewes south to Rehoboth Beach in 1878, running down the center of today's Rehoboth Avenue. The arrival of the railroad allowed visitors to come in from northern Delaware and Pennsylvania and its cities and towns, leading to the beginning of Rehoboth Beach as a tourist destination. After the railroad came to Rehoboth Beach, the center of camp meetings and city life moved to nearby Baltimore Avenue. The original Henlopen Hotel opened in 1879, being replaced with another hotel of the same name on the current site. A paved highway was built by the state between Georgetown and Rehoboth Beach in 1925, which helped bring in travelers from the west in the metropolitan areas of Washington, D.C., Baltimore and other parts of Maryland and northern Virginia.

From 1942 to 1943, Rehoboth Beach Airport served as a base, designated as Coastal Patrol Base 2, for volunteers with the Civil Air Patrol, who flew aerial patrols using civilian aircraft in support of Army and Navy anti-submarine operations during the Battle of the Atlantic. Two CAP airmen, Captain Hugh R. Sharp of Greenville, Delaware and First Lieutenant Edmond Edwards of Newark Delaware, would go on to be the first civilians to receive the Air Medal after a search and rescue mission on 21 July, 1942 where they rescued one crewmember of another CAP aircraft which crashed at sea. Rehoboth Beach Airport shut down in 1987 and Rehoboth Shores Estates Community now stands on the former grounds. The Delaware Public Archives placed a historical marker on the site of the former airport commemorating Coastal Patrol Base 2 in 2006.

The Avery's Rest Site, Dodd Homestead, Peter Marsh House, Thompson's Loss and Gain Site, Thompsons Island Site, Warrington Site, and Woman's Christian Temperance Union Fountain are listed on the National Register of Historic Places, maintained by the National Park Service of the United States Department of the Interior.

Modern resort town
The town often bills itself as "The Nation's Summer Capital" because it is a frequent summer vacation destination for Washington, D.C. residents as well as visitors from Maryland, Virginia, and Pennsylvania. Vacationers are drawn for many reasons, including the town's charm and the absence of a sales tax in Delaware. The Funland amusement park, which opened in 1962, is located along the boardwalk between Delaware and Brooklyn avenues. Several restaurants and shops are located along the town's main street, Rehoboth Avenue. Outside of Rehoboth Beach along Delaware Route 1, are the Tanger Outlets, which operate three locations along the highway with over 130 outlet stores.

Due to its proximity to Washington, D.C., Rehoboth Beach is a popular summer destination among members of the United States Congress. Joe Biden, the current President of the United States, and current First Lady, Jill Biden, have a beach house outside the corporate limits of Rehoboth Beach in the North Shores neighborhood. This beach house serves as their "Summer White House".

Rehoboth Beach is also known as one of the mid-Atlantic coast's popular LGBT-friendly getaways due to the large number of LGBT-owned and operated businesses, and because of the LGBT-frequented stretch of beach near Queen Street at the south end of the boardwalk, known as Poodle Beach. Poodle Beach tends to attract gay men while North Shore Beach within Cape Henlopen State Park tends to attract lesbian women.

Rehoboth Beach has a seasonal beach patrol who is in charge of lifeguarding the one and a half miles that make up the town's beachfront. They operate from Memorial Day weekend into the following fall season. The beach patrol is on duty every day between Memorial Day until Labor Day from 10 am until 5 pm on weekdays, and 10 am until 5:30 pm on weekends.

The Rehoboth Beach Bandstand is located on Rehoboth Avenue near the boardwalk and serves as a free open-air music and entertainment venue in the summer months, with performances from over 50 bands during the season. Performances have been held at the Rehoboth Beach Bandstand since 1963.

Reader's Digest named the Rehoboth Beach Boardwalk as "Best of America" and featured it in the May 2006 issue. Additionally, AARP has named Rehoboth Beach as one of five dream towns as "Best Places to Retire".

The town has several festivals including the Sea Witch Festival, the Rehoboth Beach Independent Film Festival, and the Rehoboth Beach Autumn Jazz Festival every year.

The Clear Space Theatre Company, a professional theater company, offers a year-round schedule of musical and dramatic productions in the Rehoboth Theatre of the Arts.

Dogfish Head Brewery's original brewpub is located on the town's main strip Rehoboth Avenue. The location has grown in years as a popular destination for American craft beer enthusiasts. Grotto Pizza was founded in Rehoboth Beach in 1960 and has grown to 23 locations throughout the state of Delaware along with parts of Maryland and Pennsylvania. Grotto Pizza has three locations in Rehoboth Beach, of which two are along the boardwalk while the other is along Rehoboth Avenue. Nicola Pizza is a well-known business in Rehoboth Beach that opened in 1971, with two locations in the town. In 2022, Nicola Pizza has relocated to Lewes. 

The restaurant scene in Rehoboth Beach was traditionally centered in the downtown area, which remains competitive. In the 21st century, a restaurant scene has begun to develop along the Delaware Route 1 corridor, where parking is more available and accessible.

In 2011, the city passed a smoking ban covering parks and playgrounds, but sparing the beach and boardwalk. The smoking ban was extended to the beach, boardwalk, and adjacent public areas in 2014. In 2017, the city implemented a ban on tents, canopies, and large umbrellas on the beach, the first such ban in Delaware.

Geography

Rehoboth Beach is bordered on the east by the Atlantic Ocean, on the north by the town of Henlopen Acres, and on the west and south by unincorporated portions of Sussex County. Cape Henlopen State Park lies just to the north of Rehoboth Beach, and Dewey Beach is just to its south.

Demographics

As of the census of 2021, there were 1,392 people residing in the city. The racial makeup of the city was 96.16% White, 0% African American, 0% Native American, 0.31% Asian, 3.02% from other races, and 0.38% from two or more races. Hispanic or Latino of any race were 0.13% of the population.

There were 847 households, out of which 6.3% had children under the age of 18 living with them, 34.8% were married couples living together, 3.9% had a female householder with no husband present, and 59.4% were non-families. 47.1% of all households were made up of individuals, and 23.4% had someone living alone who was 65 years of age or older. The average household size was 1.76 and the average family size was 2.04.

In the city, the population was spread out, with 7.0% under the age of 18, 3.7% from 18 to 24, 18.5% from 25 to 44, 33.3% from 45 to 64, and 37.5% who were 65 years of age or older. The median age was 57 years. For every 100 females, there were 92.7 males. For every 100 females age 18 and over, there were 89.8 males.

The median income for a household in the city was $43,194 and the median income for a family was $255,755.00. Males had a median income of $83,750 versus $27,447 for females. The per capita income for the city was $140,284.00. About 1.42% of families and 2.44% of the population were below the poverty line, including 8.82% of those under age 18 and 2.2% of those age 65 or over.

Government
Rehoboth Beach is governed by a mayor and a city manager. As of 2020, the mayor is Stan Mills and the city manager is Sharon Lynn. There are several departments, city boards, commissions, and committees that oversee the daily functions of the city government. Some of these officials are elected while others are appointed.

Police services in Rehoboth Beach is provided by the Rehoboth Beach Police Department, which consists of 17 full-time officers and nine full-time dispatchers, along with additional seasonal police officers in the peak summer months. Fire protection to Rehoboth Beach and nearby areas is provided by the Rehoboth Beach Volunteer Fire Company, which maintains three stations.

Parks and recreation

In addition to beaches along the Atlantic Ocean, there are several parks located in Rehoboth Beach. Grove Park is home to a playground, pavilion, restrooms, and benches. Stockley Street Park is located along Silver Lake and has benches and a playground. Teardrop Park offers a dock along Silver Lake. Lake Gerar Park is located along Lake Gerar and has benches and a playground. There are tennis courts that are located at Deauville Beach. Deer Park and Central Park offer wooded areas that allow for wildlife viewing. Lee Street Park offers trees for shade. Martin's Lawn, located near the Anna Hazzard Museum and the Senior Center, offers a grassy area and trees.

Infrastructure

Transportation

Delaware Route 1 (Coastal Highway) passes along the southwestern edge of the city. Delaware Route 1A crosses through Rehoboth Beach in an L shape, running east from DE 1 and heading across a drawbridge over the Lewes and Rehoboth Canal into the city, where it heads east along Rehoboth Avenue to 2nd Street, then south along 2nd Street, Bayard Avenue, and Silver Lake Drive to another junction with DE 1 in Dewey Beach. Delaware Route 1B provides another route into Rehoboth Beach via State Road, connecting to DE 1 south of a high-level crossing of the Lewes and Rehoboth Canal. On-street parking in the downtown area is regulated by parking meters from the Friday before Memorial Day to the second Sunday after Labor Day. Between the Friday before Memorial Day and Labor Day, parking permits are required for all non-metered on-street parking spaces in Rehoboth Beach. A parking lot is also available at Deauville Beach in the northern part of the city, with parking permits required between the Friday before Memorial Day and the second Sunday after Labor Day.

The Delaware Department of Transportation operates a park and ride lot called the Rehoboth Beach Park and Ride just outside the city limits, located along Shuttle Road off of DE-1. During the peak summer months, DART First State operates Beach Bus service that provides frequent service in and out of the city and to the rest of the Delaware Beaches area and to Ocean City, Maryland, where it connects to Ocean City Transportation's Coastal Highway Beach Bus, from the Park and Ride lot. On summer weekends and holidays, DART First State operates the Route 305 "Beach Connection" service, which runs from Wilmington to the Park and Ride outside Rehoboth Beach, with intermediate stops at the Christiana Mall, Middletown, Dover, Frederica, and the Lewes Transit Center. DART First State also operates the year-round Route 201 service running between Rehoboth Beach and the Lewes Transit Center and the year-round Route 215 service which connects Rehoboth Beach with Millsboro; both of these routes offer expanded summer Beach Bus service.

The Delaware River and Bay Authority operates a shuttle bus during the summer months to the Tanger Outlets and the park and ride lot in Rehoboth Beach from the Cape May–Lewes Ferry, which provides ferry service across the Delaware Bay to Cape May, New Jersey.

The Jolly Trolley is a private shuttle service that provides frequent transport in Rehoboth Beach and to neighboring Dewey Beach. The service operates daily through the summer tourist season between Memorial Day weekend and Labor Day and on weekends in the shoulder season before Memorial Day and after Labor Day.

BestBus offers intercity bus service to Rehoboth Beach from Union Station and Dupont Circle in Washington, D.C. and 34th Street in the Midtown Manhattan section of New York City on weekends in the summer months.

The Junction and Breakwater Trail is a rail trail for bicyclists and hikers that connects Lewes and Rehoboth Beach, running  mostly along a former Penn Central Railroad right-of-way.

Utilities
Delmarva Power, a subsidiary of Exelon, provides electricity to Rehoboth Beach. Chesapeake Utilities provides natural gas to the city. The city's Water Department provides water service and the city's Waste Water Department provides sewer service in Rehoboth Beach and nearby outlying areas including North Shores and Breezewood. The city's Streets Department provides trash and recycling collection to homes and businesses in Rehoboth Beach.

Education
Rehoboth Beach is located in the Cape Henlopen School District. The Rehoboth School District was consolidated into the Cape Henlopen district in 1969.

Rehoboth Beach is zoned to Rehoboth Elementary School. It is on a  plot of land. The current building was to open in 2019. It has  of space. In the same location as the former building, uses the same design as Brittingham and Love Creek schools. It had a cost of $33 million.

Cape Henlopen High School, located in Lewes, is the sole comprehensive high school of the district.

Climate

Situated on the Atlantic Coastal Plain, Rehoboth Beach's climate is moderated by the Atlantic Ocean and the Rehoboth Bay. According to the Trewartha climate classification system, Rehoboth Beach has a humid subtropical climate with hot and moderately humid summers, cool winters and year-around precipitation (Cfak). Cfak climates are characterized by all months having an average mean temperature > 32.0 °F (> 0.0 °C), at least eight months with an average mean temperature ≥ 50.0 °F (≥ 10.0 °C), at least one month with an average mean temperature ≥ 71.6 °F (≥ 22.0 °C) and no significant precipitation difference between seasons. During the summer months in Rehoboth Beach, a cooling afternoon sea breeze is present on most days, but episodes of extreme heat and humidity can occur with heat index values ≥ 100 °F (≥ 38 °C). 

During the winter months, episodes of extreme cold and wind can occur with wind chill values < 0 °F (< -18 °C). The plant hardiness zone in Rehoboth Beach is 7b with an average annual extreme minimum air temperature of 8.1 °F (-13.3 °C). The average seasonal (Nov–Apr) snowfall total is 6 to 12 inches (15 to 30 cm) and the average snowiest month is February which corresponds with the annual peak in nor'easter activity.

Ecology

According to the A. W. Kuchler U.S. potential natural vegetation types, Rehoboth Beach, Delaware has a dominant vegetation type of Oak/Hickory/Pine (111) with a dominant vegetation form of Southern Mixed Forest (26).

Notable people
Sarah Aldridge, writer of mainly lesbian fiction under pen name Anyda Marchant
Joe Biden, 46th President of the United States (2021–present), 47th Vice President of the United States (2009–2017), United States Senator from Delaware (1973–2009), and Jill Biden, educator and First Lady of the United States (2021–present), Second Lady of the United States (2009–2017) own a beach house in the North Shores neighborhood, just north of the Rehoboth Beach city limits
Tony Coelho, United States Representative for California's 15th congressional district (1979–1989) 
John Delaney, United States Representative for Maryland's 6th congressional district (2013–2019) and candidate for President of the United States in 2020, owns a beach house in the North Shores neighborhood, just north of the Rehoboth Beach city limits
A. Felix du Pont, member of the du Pont family who served as vice president and director of E. I. du Pont de Nemours & Co., owned a summer home in Rehoboth Beach 
Mary Beth Ellis, long-distance triathlete
Robert Gover, journalist and novelist
Aurelio Grisanty, artist who painted the Beach Town Posters series
Robert Cutler Hinckley, artist who painted portraits
Tony Kornheiser, co-host of Pardon the Interruption on ESPN and former sportswriter
Kathy McGuiness, Delaware State Auditor (2019–present)
Robert McG. Thomas Jr., journalist, owned a summer home in Rehoboth Beach
William H. Vernon, member of the Delaware House of Representatives (1977–1981)

References

Further reading 
 ADC Sussex County, Delaware Street Map Book, 1st Edition. Alexandria, Virginia: Alexandria Drafting Company, 2005.
 Meehan, James D. From Saints to Sinners...Rehoboth Beach Memoirs. Bethany Beach, Delaware: Harold E. Dukes, Jr., 2000.m .

External links

Rehoboth Beach Main Street – Nonprofit Downtown Organization

 
Beaches of Delaware
Gay villages in the United States
Seaside resorts in Delaware
Populated places established in 1873
Cities in Sussex County, Delaware
1873 establishments in Delaware
Cities in Delaware
Salisbury metropolitan area
Landforms of Sussex County, Delaware
Populated coastal places in Delaware
LGBT culture in the United States
LGBT history in the United States